Cha Sang-Kwang is a South Korean football goalkeeping coach. He played in 1992 Dynasty Cup, 1994 Hiroshima Asian Games, and 1995 Korea Cup.

Cha Sang-kwang was Goalkeeper coach of South Korea national under-17 football team in 2015 FIFA World Cup

Honors and awards

Player
Lucky-Goldstar Hwangso
 K-League Winners (2) : 1985, 1990

Individual
 K-League Best XI (1) : 1989
 K-League Best GK (1) : 1989

References

External links
 

1963 births
Living people
Association football goalkeepers
South Korean footballers
FC Seoul players
Pohang Steelers players
Jeju United FC players
Seongnam FC players
K League 1 players
Hanyang University alumni
Footballers at the 1994 Asian Games
Asian Games competitors for South Korea